Rumor Had It was the first EP released by A Balladeer. It was released by the band itself, not being signed by a record label. It was re-issued in December 2007.

Track listing
(All songs written by Marinus de Goederen unless otherwise noted)

 "I Saw You Hiding From The Rain Today" - 1:05
 "Rumor Had It" - 3:52
 "They've Shut Down Marks & Spencer" - 3:49
 "Left-Over Tears, Lost" - 2:30

2004 EPs